Zijderveld is a village in the Dutch province of Utrecht (province). It is located about 6 km northeast of Leerdam, in the municipality of Vijfheerenlanden.

The village was first mentioned in 1282 as Zijtwendervelt, and means "field at a sidewards dike". The Dutch Reformed Church dates from the 15th century, and has been rebuilt in 1830. In 1840, it was home to 532 people.

Gallery

References 

Populated places in Utrecht (province)
Vijfheerenlanden